Dhimitër Orgocka (24 October 1936 – 1 January 2021) was an Albanian film and theater actor and director, and People's Artist of Albania for his artistical merits.

Personal life 
He was born in 1936 in Korçë, Albania, when Zog I was King of Albania, and graduated in the Faculty of Albanian Language in the University of Tirana. He was married to Dhorkë Orgocka, a Merited Artist of Albania actress.

He died of cerebral hemorrhage.

Working career 
Orgocka started to work as a director right after school in the Andon Zako Çajupi theater of Korçë, in which he has directed around 100 premières.

His first role as an actor was that of Gjergj in the "Great Love" drama from Fatmir Gjata, whereas his first work as a director was that of "The house on the lane" from Teodor Laço. He has also acted in movies such as in "The Gramaphone General", and "Nothing can be forgotten".

Awards 
He was a recipient of the following national and international awards:
 People's Artist of Albania
 Best role for the monodrama Amok from Stephan Zweig (in the 8th Festival of Theaters in Kiev Ukraine, 2005)
 Best role for the monodrama Amok from Stephan Zweig (in the Festival of International Theaters in Bitola and Macedonia, 2005).
 Grand Prize Sulejman Pitarka for directing the drama "Dhëndër për Kristinën" of Skënder Demollit in the 5th festival of the Albanian Theaters (in Macedonia, "Dibra 2006").
 Cup of Festival for the monodrama Amok from Stephan Zweig (in the international festival of Monodramas në Vroslav, Poland 2007)

Recognition 
In 2007, The House of Culture of Maliq was named after him, "Dhimitër Orgocka House of Culture".

References

External links 

The New York Times Movies

1936 births
2021 deaths
Albanian male film actors
People from Korçë
University of Tirana alumni
People's Artists of Albania
Albanian male stage actors
20th-century Albanian male actors
21st-century Albanian male actors
Albanian theatre directors